Eisenbergiella massiliensis is a bacterium from the genus of Eisenbergiella which has been isolated from human feaces.

References

Lachnospiraceae
Bacteria described in 2016